A referendum on the political status of Puerto Rico was held on December 13, 1998. Voters were given the choice between statehood, independence, free association, being a territorial commonwealth, or none of the given options. A majority voted for the latter, with a turnout of 71.3%.

Five alternatives were listed on the ballot: "limited self-government"; "free association"; "statehood"; "sovereignty"; and "none of the above." Disputes arose as to the definition of each of the ballot alternatives; and commonwealth advocates, among others, reportedly urged a vote for "none of the above." They asserted that the commonwealth definition on the ballot "failed to recognize both the constitutional protections afforded to our U.S. citizenship and the fact that the relationship is based upon the mutual consent of Puerto Rico and the United States." In the end, a slim majority of voters in that plebiscite selected "none of the above" (50.3%).

Definition of status options

The resulting political climate after the 1998 plebiscite reflected the need for proper definitions of status options.

In its June 2011, Political Status of Puerto Rico: Options for Congress report, the Congressional Research Service states that the "definitions or, more specifically, the lack of definitions of the political status options for Puerto Rico, compound the complexity of the debate." The report stated that constitutional implications of three status options ("new commonwealth," statehood, and independence) were reviewed by the Department of Justice in response to a congressional request. The history of debate, particularly the 1998 plebiscite, indicates that in the absence of constitutionally valid status options and definitions acceptable to Congress, the debate over status yields few or no conclusive results. The brief summaries of the options analysis on pages 26 and 27 of the report follow:

Commonwealth
The commonwealth option represents a continuation of the current status of Puerto Rico. The territorial clause of the United States Constitution empowers Congress with the authority to regulate territories. Commonwealth status for Puerto Rico is based on statutory provisions and the Constitution of Puerto Rico that established a republican form of self-government. (Puerto Rico Federal Relations Act, P.L. 81-600, 64 Stat. 319). Under current federal law, residents of Puerto Rico enjoy U.S. citizenship, but many contend that the Puerto Rican identity reflects a degree of autonomy that enables the island to remain somewhat separate from, but part of, the United States. On the 1992, "Memorandum for the Heads of Executive Departments and Agencies" of President George H.W. Bush, it described the relationship of the Commonwealth to the United States with regard to the administration of federal programs, as follows: "Because Puerto Rico's degree of constitutional self-government, population, and size set it apart from other areas also subject to federal jurisdiction under Article IV, section 3, clause 2 of the Constitution, I hereby direct all federal departments, agencies, and officials, to the extent consistent with the Constitution and the laws of the United States, hence-forward to treat Puerto Rico administratively as if it were a state, except insofar as doing so with respect to an existing federal program or activity would increase or decrease federal receipts or expenditures, or would seriously disrupt the operation of such program or activity." Some support an enhanced or "new" commonwealth status and seek changes in the current relationship to increase the autonomy of Puerto Rico. Aspects of enhanced commonwealth considered but rejected by Congress in 1991 and 2001 included providing the government of Puerto Rico authority to certify that certain federal laws would not be applicable to the commonwealth, mandating that the President consult with the governor on appointments to federal offices in Puerto Rico that require Senate approval, recognizing a permanent relationship between Puerto Rico and the United States that cannot be unilaterally changed, and establishing economic relationships with other nations. Concepts associated with enhanced or new commonwealth have not been published in 2005, but the former governor has reportedly sought additional sovereign authority that would enable Puerto Rico's government officials to negotiate international agreements and establish new intergovernmental fiscal relations with the federal government. The Department of Justice (Raben Letter) found that certain aspects of a "New Commonwealth" proposal described in PDP platform documents could be, or are: "constitutionally unenforceable" or flawed (mutual consent provisions and delegation of powers), of uncertain legality (statutory citizenship, and international agreements), and possibly subject to constitutional limits (Resident Commissioner authority).
Free association
This option would establish Puerto Rico as a sovereign nation separate from, but legally bound (on a terminable basis) to, the United States. As a general practice, free association would be preceded by recognition that Puerto Rico is a self-governing sovereign nation not part of the United States, because compacts of free association are legal documents between sovereign nations. Free association could be accompanied by a transition period in which the United States would continue to administer certain services and provide assistance to the island for a period of time specified in the compact. Free association could be annulled at any time by either nation. Negotiations over free association would likely decide issues of trade, defense, currency, and economic aid.
Independence
Some advocates of independence contend that the cultural identity of Puerto Ricans, and other factors, justify independence. As residents of a sovereign independent nation, Puerto Ricans could develop closer ties to Caribbean nations, but would likely be forced to choose between citizenship in the United States or in Puerto Rico. The current unrestricted travel between the United States and the island might end, as would federal benefits (unless specified in the enabling legislation). Puerto Rico would, as a sovereign nation, develop its own economy, form of government, and complete national identity.
Statehood
Advocates of statehood contend that the full rights and responsibilities of citizenship should be granted to residents of Puerto Rico. Political stability, particularly as an economic development tool, is seen by some to be one significant advantage of statehood. As residents of a state, Puerto Ricans would be entitled to full representation in Congress, would be subject to income taxes, and would be eligible to receive federal assistance like that provided to all of the states. Opponents argue that statehood would result in a loss of national identity.

Results

References

1998 referendums
1998
1998 in Puerto Rico
Puerto Rico
December 1998 events in North America
Multiple-choice referendums